Walter Sinclair Barclay (2 May 1902 – 1 December 1959) was a New Zealand cricketer who played first-class cricket for Wellington from 1921 to 1926.

Wally Barclay's family moved from Otago to Wellington when he was a boy. His father had a senior position with the New Zealand Railways Department.

Barclay captained the cricket team at Wellington College in 1919. In 1920, playing his first match of senior club cricket in Wellington for Old Boys, he scored 108. He was the first player to score a century on debut in Wellington senior cricket.

He played for Wellington for some seasons with one outstanding performance, when he took 6 for 65 and 4 for 49 in the victory over Otago in 1921–22. He was selected to play for North Island against South Island at the end of the season, and again contributed substantially to victory, this time by scoring 67 not out in the first innings. Batting at number 10, he went to the wicket with the score at 130 for 8 in reply to South Island's 169, and added 113 for the ninth wicket with Cyril Allcott.

He also played Rugby union for Wellington. He should not be confused with Wattie Barclay (Walter Pukauae Barclay, 1895 – 1985), who captained the New Zealand Māoris in the 1920s.

At his death after a short illness in 1959, Barclay was district administration officer in the Lands and Survey Department at New Plymouth. He had worked for the department since 1920, except for a period with the Department of Scientific and Industrial Research during the Second World war.

His son Colin played first-class cricket for Central Districts in the 1950s. Colin and his brother Laurie also played Hawke Cup
cricket for Taranaki.

References

External links
 
 

1902 births
1959 deaths
People educated at Wellington College (New Zealand)
New Zealand cricketers
Wellington cricketers
Wellington rugby union players
North Island cricketers